Sholto Charles Douglas, 15th Earl of Morton (c. 1732–25 September 1774) was the son of James Douglas, 14th Earl of Morton.

He was Colonel of a regiment of light dragoons, the 17th Regiment of Light Dragoons, raised in Scotland in 1759 and disbanded in 1763.

In February 1754 he was elected a Fellow of the Royal Society

On 19 November 1758, he married Katherine Hamilton and they had two sons:
George Douglas, 16th Earl of Morton (1761–1827)
Lt. Hon. Hamilton Douglas Halyburton (10 October 1763 – 31 December 1783), who died of exposure while commanding the barge of HMS Assistance. His party was caught in a snowstorm while looking for deserters and wrecked on Sandy Hook.

Notes

1732 births
1774 deaths
Earls of Morton
Sholto Douglas, 15th Earl of Morton
Fellows of the Royal Society
Grand Masters of the Premier Grand Lodge of England
Freemasons of the Premier Grand Lodge of England